This is a list of events in animation in 2016.

Events

January
 January 10: The Simpsons episode "Teenage Mutant Milk-Caused Hurdles" is first broadcast, with the couch gag being animated by Steve Cutts.

February
 February 6: 43rd Annie Awards
 February 15: The final episode of Gravity Falls, "Weirdmageddon 3: Take Back the Falls", premiered to universal acclaim.
 February 28: 88th Academy Awards:
 Inside Out by Pete Docter and Jonas Rivera wins the Academy Award for Best Animated Feature.
 Bear Story by Pato Escala Pierart and Gabriel Osorio Vargas wins the Academy Award for Best Animated Short Film.

March
 March 4: Zootopia is released by Walt Disney Studios.
 March 6: The Simpsons episode "Lisa the Veterinarian" is first broadcast, with the couch gag being animated by Bill Plympton.

April
 April 24: The Simpsons episode "Fland Canyon" is first broadcast, with the couch gag being animated by Disney animator Eric Goldberg.

May
 May 2: The first episode of The Loud House airs.
 May 8: The Simpsons episode "To Courier with Love" is first broadcast, in which the family visits Paris, France.

June
 June 11: The final episode of the original BoBoiBoy series.

July
 July 20: The Haunted House debuts on Tooniverse in South Korea.

August
 August 12: Sausage Party is released as the first full-length computer-animated feature film to be rated R.

September
 September 25: The Simpsons episode "Monty Burns' Fleeing Circus" is first broadcast, guest starring and having the couch gag animated by Adventure Time creator Pendleton Ward.

October
 October 12: 2016 becomes the first year where two animated films gross over $1 billion: Zootopia and Finding Dory.
 October 16: The 600th episode of The Simpsons, "Treehouse of Horror XXVII", is first broadcast.
 October 17: Steve Cutts's animated music video set to Moby's Are You Lost In The World Like Me? is released.

November
 November 13: The Simpsons episode "Havana Wild Weekend" is first broadcast, in which the family visits Cuba.
 November 23: Moana by Walt Disney Animation Studios is released.

December
 December 11: The Simpsons episode "The Nightmare After Krustmas" is first broadcast, guest starring hockey player Wayne Gretzky.
 December 14: The Lion King and Who Framed Roger Rabbit are added to the National Film Registry.

Awards
 Academy Award for Best Animated Feature: Zootopia
 Academy Award for Best Animated Short Film: Piper
 Annecy International Animated Film Festival Cristal du long métrage: My Life as a Zucchini
 Annie Award for Best Animated Feature: Zootopia
 Asia Pacific Screen Award for Best Animated Feature Film: Seoul Station
 BAFTA Award for Best Animated Film: Kubo and the Two Strings
 César Award for Best Animated Film: The Little Prince
 European Film Award for Best Animated Film: My Life as a Zucchini
 Golden Globe Award for Best Animated Feature Film: Zootopia
 Goya Award for Best Animated Film: Birdboy: The Forgotten Children
 Japan Academy Prize for Animation of the Year: The Boy and the Beast
 Mainichi Film Awards - Animation Grand Award: Your Name

Films released

 January 1:
 The Emperor's New Clothes (China)
 Ivan Tsarevich and the Gray Wolf 3 (Russia)
 Kunta 2 (China)
 January 8:
 Chhota Bheem Himalayan Adventures (India)
 Kizumonogatari Part 1: Tekketsu (Japan)
 January 9: 
 Garakowa -Restore the World- (Japan)
 King of Prism by PrettyRhythm (Japan)
 January 15:
 Barbie: Spy Squad (United States)
 Norm of the North (United States and India)
 January 16 - Boonie Bears: The Big Top Secret (China)
 January 20 - Batman: Bad Blood (United States)
 January 21 - The Tayo Movie: Missing: Ace (South Korea)
 January 22 - El Americano: The Movie (United States and Mexico)
 January 23:
 Kung Fu Panda 3 (United States and China)
 Persona 3 The Movie: No. 4, Winter of Rebirth (Japan)
 January 24:
 The Ape Story (China)
 Fruity Robo The Great Escape (China)
 February 2 - The Land Before Time XIV: Journey of the Brave (United States)
 February 3 - Dofus, Book 1: Julith (France)
 February 6 - Code Geass: Boukoku no Akito Final (Japan)
 February 8 - Mr. Nian (China)
 February 9 - Lego DC Comics Super Heroes: Justice League – Cosmic Clash (United States)
 February 13 - Selector Destructed WIXOSS (Japan)
 February 14:
 Quackerz (Russia)
 The Secret Princess (United Kingdom)
 February 15 - Ted Sieger's Molly Monster (Switzerland, Germany and Sweden)
 February 19 - The Frog Kingdom 2: Sub-Zero Mission (China)
 February 20 - Dōkyūsei (Japan)
 February 27 - Gekijōban Tantei Opera Milky Holmes ~Gyakushū no Milky Holmes~ (Japan)
 March 3:
 Bling (South Korea and United States)
 BoBoiBoy: The Movie (Malaysia)
 March 4 - Zootopia (United States)
 March 5 - Doraemon: Nobita and the Birth of Japan 2016 (Japan)
 March 11 - Shimajiro In Bookland (Japan)
 March 12:
 Digimon Adventure tri. Determination (Japan)
 PriPara Mi~nna no Akogare Let's Go PriPari (Japan)
 March 17 - Kikoriki: Legend of the Golden Dragon (Russia)
 March 19 - Eiga Precure All Stars Minna de Utau Kiseki no Mahō (Japan)
 March 24 - Murderous Tales (Czech Republic and Slovakia)
 March 29 - Justice League vs. Teen Titans (United States)
 March 30 - Robinson Crusoe (Belgium and France)
 April 2 - Tamayura 4 (Japan)
 April 16:
 Crayon Shin-chan: Fast Asleep! Dreaming World Big Assault! (Japan)
 Detective Conan: Junkoku no Nightmare (Japan)
 April 22 - Spark (United States, Canada and South Korea)
 April 23:
 Gekijō-ban Hibike! Euphonium ~ Kitauji Kōkō Suisōraku-Bu e Yōkoso~ (Japan)
 Nova Seed (Japan and Canada)
 Yu-Gi-Oh!: The Dark Side of Dimensions (Japan)
 Zutto Mae Kara Suki Deshita: Kokuhaku Jikkō Iinkai (Japan)
 April 28 - Sheep and Wolves (Russia)
 April 29 - Ratchet & Clank (United States and Canada)
 May 6 - Ajin Part 2: Shōtotsu (Japan)
 May 10:
 Alpha and Omega: Dino Digs (United States and Canada)
 Lego Scooby-Doo! Haunted Hollywood (United States)
 May 17 - Izzie's Way Home (United States)
 May 20 - The Angry Birds Movie (United States and Finland)
 May 21:
 Garo: Divine Flame (Japan)
 Naze Ikiru: Rennyo Shounin to Yoshizaki Enjou (Japan)
 June 5 - Jak uratować mamę (Poland)
 June 17 - Finding Dory (United States)
 June 21: 
 Lego DC Comics Super Heroes: Justice League – Gotham City Breakout (United States)
 Tom and Jerry: Back to Oz (United States)
 June 29 - The Red Turtle (France and Japan)
 July 8:
 Big Fish & Begonia (China)
 Rock Dog (United States and China)
 The Secret Life of Pets (United States)
 July 9 - Kingsglaive: Final Fantasy XV (Japan)
 July 16 - Pokémon the Movie: Volcanion and the Mechanical Marvel (Japan)
 July 22:
 Batman: The Killing Joke (United States)
 Bobby the Hedgehog (China)
 Ice Age: Collision Course (United States)
 July 23:
 Accel World: Infinite Burst (Japan)
 One Piece Film: Gold (Japan)
 July 26 - Scooby-Doo! and WWE: Curse of the Speed Demon (United States)
 July 29 - Yugo & Lala 3 (China)
 July 30 - Barbie: Star Light Adventure (United States)
 August 6 - Rudolf the Black Cat (Japan)
 August 9 - DC Super Hero Girls: Hero of the Year (United States)
 August 12 - Sausage Party (United States)
 August 13 - Gekijōban Aikatsu Stars! (Japan)
 August 18 - Seoul Station (South Korea)
 August 19:
 Kizumonogatari II: Nekketsu-hen (Japan)
 Kubo and the Two Strings (United States)
 New Happy Dad and Son 2: The Instant Genius (China)
 Throne of Elves (China)
 August 26 - Your name. (Japan)
 August 30 - Batman Unlimited: Mechs vs. Mutants (United States)
 September 6 - The Swan Princess: Princess Tomorrow, Pirate Today (United States and India)
 September 7 - Lost in the Moonlight (South Korea)
 September 9 - Yowamushi pedal : spare bike (Japan)
 September 11 - My Entire High School Sinking Into the Sea (United States)
 September 15:
 Godbeast Megazord: Return of Green Dragon (China)
 McDull: Rise of the Rice Cooker (China and Hong Kong)
 September 17 - A Silent Voice (Japan)
 September 22 - My Life as a Zucchini (France and Switzerland)
 September 23:
 Ajin Part 3: Shōgeki (Japan)
 Storks (United States)
 September 24 - Digimon Adventure tri. Confession (Japan)
 October 1:
 I Am Nezha (China)
 My Little Pony: Equestria Girls – Legend of Everfree (Canada and United States)
 October 3 - Howard Lovecraft and the Frozen Kingdom (Canada)
 October 10 - Batman: Return of the Caped Crusaders (United States)
 October 13 - The Dragon Spell (Ukraine)
 October 14:
 Gantz: O (Japan)
 Ozzy (Spain and Canada)
 October 18 - Barbie & Her Sisters in A Puppy Chase (United States)
 October 19 - Motu Patlu: King Of Kings (India)
 October 21:
 Ghost Patrol (Canada)
 La Leyenda del Chupacabras (Mexico)
 October 22:
 My Dogs, JinJin & Akida (South Korea)
 The Oddsockeaters (Czech Republic, Slovakia and Croatia)
 October 25 - Trolland (United States)
 October 27 - Sinbad: Pirates of the Seven Storms (Russia)
 November 4 - Trolls (United States)
 November 8 - Alpha and Omega: The Big Fureeze (United States)
 November 10:
 Get Santa (Sweden and Denmark)
 Hood's Mad Animals (Russia)
 November 11:
 Chaar Sahibzaade: Rise of Banda Singh Bahadur (India)
 Omnivirtuous Srimanta Sankardeva (India)
 November 12 - In This Corner of the World (Japan)
 November 18 - Orange: Future (Japan)
 November 23:
 Louise by the Shore (Belgium and France)
 Moana (United States)
 November 26 - KanColle: The Movie (Japan)
 December 3 - Chain Chronicle: Light of Haecceitas (Japan)
 December 6 - Nerdland (United States)
 December 9 - Albert (United States)
 December 10 - Monster Strike The Movie (Japan)
 December 14:
 Ballerina (France and Canada)
 The Girl Without Hands (France)
 December 17:
 Suki ni Naru Sono Shunkan o: Kokuhaku Jikkō Iinkai (Japan)
 Yo-kai Watch: Sora Tobu Kujira to Double no Sekai no Daibōken da Nyan! (Japan)
 December 21 - Sing (United States)
 December 23:
 Pixi Post & the Gift Bringers (Spain and Colombia)
 Pop In Q (Japan)
 December 25: 
 Bamse and the Witch's Daughter (Sweden)
 In the Forest of Huckybucky (Norway)
 Little Door Gods (China)
 Saving Sally (Philippines)
 December 28 - Ethel & Ernest (United Kingdom)
 December 29 - The Snow Queen 3: Fire and Ice (Russia)
 December 31 - Kabaneri of the Iron Fortress Recap 1: Gathering Light (Japan)
 Specific date unknown:
 Deity Hunt (China)
 Shinjuku (United States)
 Smart (United States and China)
 Yellow Brick Road (United States)

Television series debuts

Television series endings

Deaths

January
 January 4: 
 Frank Armitage, Australian-American painter and muralist (Walt Disney Animation Studios), dies at age 91.
 Robert Balser, American animator, producer and director (animation director on Yellow Submarine and Heavy Metal, The Triplets), dies at age 88.
 January 5: Christine Lawrence Finney, American painter and animator, dies at age 47.
 January 6: Pat Harrington Jr., American actor (voice of Ray Palmer/Atom and Roy Harper/Speedy in The Superman/Aquaman Hour of Adventure, the title character and Deux-Deux in The Inspector shorts, Moe Howard in The New Scooby-Doo Movies, Jon's father in A Garfield Christmas), dies at age 86.
 January 7: Richard Libertini, American actor (voice of Dijon in DuckTales, Wally Llama in the Animaniacs episode "Wally Llama", Tellyrand in the Pinky and the Brain episode "Napoleon Brainaparte", Mr. Marini in the Life With Louie episode "Mr. Anderson's Opus", Commissioner in The Real Adventures of Jonny Quest episode "Bloodlines", Information Desk Clerk in the Duckman episode "Das Sub", Ragtag in the Static Shock episode "Power Play", Dr. Myrell in The Zeta Project episode "The Wrong Morph", Apple Merchant in The Greatest Adventure: Stories from the Bible episode "The Creation"), dies at age 82.
 January 10: David Bowie, English rock singer and actor (voice of Emperor Maltazard in Arthur and the Invisibles, Lord Royal Highness in the SpongeBob SquarePants episode "SpongeBob's Atlantis SquarePantis"), dies at age 69.
 January 13: Brian Bedford, English actor (voice of the title character in Robin Hood), dies at age 80.
 January 14: J.R. Horne, American actor (voice of Stan of the Swamp in Wallykazam!, additional voices in Courage the Cowardly Dog), dies at age 72.
 January 19: Mike Docherty, Scottish comics artist and animator, dies at age 60.
 January 26: Martin Lavut, Canadian actor (voice of Wheez Weezel in The Devil and Daniel Mouse, Magic Mirror in Intergalactic Thanksgiving, Ard in Heavy Metal, Mylar in Rock & Rule, Mr. Settergren in Pippi Longstocking), dies at age 81.
 January 27: William E. Martin, American actor (voice of Rock Man in The Point!, Nightmare King in Little Nemo: Adventures in Slumberland, Shredder in seasons 8 and 10 of Teenage Mutant Ninja Turtles, Samhain in The Real Ghostbusters), dies at age 70.

February
 February 3: Joe Alaskey, American actor (voice of Grandpa Lou in Rugrats and Uncle Stinkie in Casper, continued voice of Bugs Bunny, Daffy Duck, and Droopy) dies at age 63.
 February 5: Ray Colcord, American composer (The Simpsons episode "Dead Putting Society"), dies from pancreatic cancer at age 66.
 February 6: Dan Gerson, American voice actor (voice of Needleman and Smitty in Monsters, Inc., Desk Sergeant in Big Hero 6, additional voices in Monsters University) and screenwriter (Duckman, Pixar, Walt Disney Animation Studios), dies at age 49.
 February 7: John Walker, American animator and director (Hanna-Barbera), dies at an unknown age.
 February 23: Antanas Janauskas, Lithuanian film director, designer and writer, dies at age 78.
 February 24: Colin Low, Canadian film director and producer (The Romance of Transportation in Canada), dies at age 89.
 February 25: Zdeněk Smetana, Czech animator, film director and graphic artist (worked for Jiri Trnka, Gene Deitch, The End of A Cube), dies at age 90.
 February 28: George Kennedy, American actor (voice of L.B. Mammoth in Cats Don't Dance), dies at age 91.

March
 March 1: Michi Kobi, American actress (additional voices in Courage the Cowardly Dog), dies at age 91.
 March 15: Daryl L. Coley, American singer (voice of Bleeding Gums Murphy in The Simpsons episode "Dancin' Homer"), dies from renal failure at age 60.
 March 16: Frank Sinatra Jr., American singer, songwriter, actor and conductor (voiced himself in the Family Guy episodes "Brian Sings and Swings", "Tales of a Third Grade Nothing" and "Bookie of the Year"), dies from cardiac arrest at age 72.
 March 17: Larry Drake, American actor and comedian (voice of Pops in Johnny Bravo), dies at age 66.
 March 24: Garry Shandling, American actor and comedian (voice of Verne in Over the Hedge, Ikki in The Jungle Book, Garry in the Dr. Katz, Professional Therapist episode "Sticky Notes", Captain Pat Lewellen in the Tom Goes to the Mayor episode "Couple's Therapy"), dies at age 66.
 March 25: Terry Brain, English animator (The Trap Door, Wallace & Gromit), dies at age 60.
 March 28: Igor Khait, American animator and film producer (Bebe's Kids, Walt Disney Company), dies from pancreatic cancer at age 52.

April
 April 3: Don Francks, Canadian actor (voice of Mok in Rock & Rule, Boba Fett in Star Wars: Droids, Sabretooth in X-Men, second voice of Dr. Claw in Inspector Gadget), dies at age 84.
 April 6: Oto Reisinger, Croatian animator, illustrator, cartoonist and comics artist (Generali, vojskovodje, admirali, Tisucu devetsto devedeset prva) dies at age 89.
 April 9: Arthur Anderson, American actor (voice of Eustace Bagge in seasons 3-4 of Courage the Cowardly Dog, original voice of Lucky the Leprechaun in Lucky Charms ads), dies at age 93.

May
 May 8: William Schallert, American actor (narrator in Sparky's Magic Piano, voice of Professor Pomfrit and Farmer P./Neville Popenbacher in What's New, Scooby-Doo?, Appa Ali Apsa in Green Lantern: First Flight, Willem in The Smurfs episode "Tis the Season to Be Smurfy", Dr. Cahill in the Jumanji episode "The Plague", Dr. Cowtiki in The Angry Beavers episode "The Day the World Got Really Screwed Up", Judge Linden in The Zeta Project episode "The River Rising"), dies at age 93.
 May 13: Makiko Futaki, Japanese animator and illustrator (Studio Ghibli), dies at age 57.
 May 14: Darwyn Cooke, Canadian animator and comics artist (Warner Bros. Animation), dies from cancer at age 53.
 May 19: Alan Young, English actor (voice of Scrooge McDuck in DuckTales, Farmer Smurf in The Smurfs, Grandpa Seville in Alvin and the Chipmunks, 7-Zark-7 and Keyop in Battle of the Planets, Haggis McHaggis in The Ren & Stimpy Show, Hiram Flaversham in The Great Mouse Detective), dies at age 96.

June
 June 2: Willis Pyle, American animator (Walt Disney Company, Walter Lantz, UPA, Peanuts, co-creator of Mr. Magoo), dies at age 101. 
 June 3: Muhammad Ali, American boxer (voiced himself in I Am the Greatest: The Adventures of Muhammad Ali), dies at age 74.
 June 12: Janet Waldo, American actress (voice of Judy Jetson in The Jetsons, Granny Sweet in Precious Pupp, Alice in Alice in Wonderland or What's a Nice Kid like You Doing in a Place like This? and Alice Through the Looking Glass, Lana Lang in The Adventures of Superboy, Nancy in Shazzan, Penelope Pitstop in Wacky Races and The Perils of Penelope Pitstop, Josie in Josie and the Pussycats, Morticia Addams in The Addams Family, Princess in Battle of the Planets, Cindy Bear in Yogi's First Christmas, Hogatha in The Smurfs, continued voice of Pearl Slaghoople in The Flintstones), dies at age 97.
 June 30: Gordon Murray, English puppeteer, animator, and film and television producer (A Rubovian Legend, Camberwick Green, Trumpton, Chigley, worked on Captain Pugwash), dies at age 95.

July
 July 19: Garry Marshall, American filmmaker and actor (voice of Buck Cluck in Chicken Little, Larry Kidkill and Sheldon Leavitt in The Simpsons, Soda Jerk in Penn Zero: Part-Time Hero, Manny Goldman in Scooby-Doo! and Kiss: Rock and Roll Mystery, Bernie in Father of the Pride, Dr. Weisberg in The Looney Tunes Show, Fred in the Rugrats episode "Club Fred", Mr. Itch in the Pinky and the Brain episode "A Pinky and the Brain Halloween", Abe in the BoJack Horseman episode "Yes And"), dies at age 81.
 July 24: Marni Nixon, American actress (sang the title song in Cinderella, voiced the singing flowers in Alice in Wonderland, singing geese in Mary Poppins, and singing voice of Grandmother Fa in Mulan), dies at age 86.
 July 26: Jack Davis, American cartoonist and illustrator (Rankin/Bass), dies at age 91.

August
 August 14: Fyvush Finkel, American actor (voice of the Narrator in The Real Shlemiel, Jackie the Schtickman in Aaahh!!! Real Monsters, Hearing Aid in The Brave Little Toaster Goes to Mars, Shlomo in the Rugrats episode "Chanukah", himself in The Simpsons episode "Lisa's Sax"), dies from heart problems at age 93.
 August 19: Jack Riley, American actor (voice of Stu Pickles in Rugrats), dies at age 80.
 August 25: Marvin Kaplan, American actor (voice of Choo-Choo in Top Cat), dies at age 89.
 August 29: Gene Wilder, American actor and comedian (voice of Letterman in The Adventures of Letterman segments in The Electric Company), dies at age 83.
 Specific date unknown: Jukka Murtosaari, Finnish animator and comics artist, dies at age 53.

September 
 September 1: Jon Polito, American actor (voice of Arnook in Avatar: The Last Airbender, Don Baffi in El Tigre: The Adventures of Manny Rivera, Commissioner Loeb in Batman: Year One, Hammerhead in the Ultimate Spider-Man episode "Return to the Spider-Verse: Part III", Griffin of Pittsford in the Rapunzel's Tangled Adventure episode "Not in the Mood", Funjil in the Chowder episode "The Moldy Touch", Sir Cranklin in the Robot and Monster episode "First Impressions", Al Capone in the Time Squad episode "The Clownfather", Mizaru in the Ben 10: Ultimate Alien episode "Simian Says"), dies at age 65.
 September 3: Anna Dewdney, American author and illustrator (creator of Llama Llama), dies at age 50.
 September 4: Wilma Baker, American animator (Walt Disney Animation Studios), dies at age 99.
 September 7: Sparky Moore, American animator and comics artist (Hanna-Barbera, Cambria Productions), dies at age 91.
 September 11: Eduard Nazarov, Russian animator, children's book illustrator and actor (Once Upon a Dog), died at age 74.
 September 17: C. Martin Croker, American animator (Space Ghost Coast to Coast, Cartoon Planet, Aqua Teen Hunger Force, The Brak Show, Assy McGee) and voice actor (voice of Zorak and Moltar in Space Ghost Coast to Coast, Dr. Weird and Steve in Aqua Teen Hunger Force, Young Man in Perfect Hair Forever), dies from food poisoning at age 54.
 September 27: Julia Kalantarova, Uzbekistan-born American background artist (Jumanji, Klasky Csupo, Globehunters: An Around the World in 80 Days Adventure, The Electric Piper, Kid Notorious, Hi Hi Puffy AmiYumi, The Buzz on Maggie, The Simpsons Movie, Christmas Is Here Again, The Goode Family, G.I. Joe: Renegades, American Dad!, Bob's Burgers), dies from respiratory infection caused by breast cancer at age 45.

October 
 October 5: Michiyo Yasuda, Japanese animator (Toei Animation, A Production, Nippon Animation, Topcraft, Studio Ghibli), dies at age 77.
 October 8:
 Gary Dubin, American actor (voice of Toulouse in The Aristocats), dies at age 57.
 Pierre Tchernia, French producer, screenwriter and animator (Asterix, Lucky Luke), dies at age 88.
 October 21: Kevin Meaney, American actor and comedian (voice of Aloysius Pig in Garfield and Friends, John in Duckman, Computer in The Brave Little Toaster to the Rescue, Widow Hutchison in the Rocko's Modern Life episodes "The Big Question" and "The Big Answer", himself in the Dr. Katz, Professional Therapist episodes "Bystander Ben", "Henna" and "Ball and Chain"), dies from a heart attack at age 60.
 October 25: Kevin Curran, American television writer and producer (The Simpsons), dies from cancer at age 59.
 October 27: Barry Anthony Trop, American composer (Captain Zed and the Zee Zone, Big Bad Beetleborgs, SpongeBob SquarePants), dies at age 64.
 October 30: Tammy Grimes, American actress (voice of Albert in "'Twas the Night Before Christmas", Molly Grue in The Last Unicorn, Catrina in My Little Pony Escape from Catrina), dies at age 82.

November
 November 4: Jean-Jacques Perrey, French electronic music performer, composer, producer and promoter (composed background music for SpongeBob SquarePants, Fetch! with Ruff Ruffman, The Mighty B!, South Park and The Simpsons), dies from lung cancer at age 87.
 November 7: Janet Reno, American lawyer (voiced herself in The Simpsons episode "Dark Knight Court"), dies from parkinson's disease at age 78.
 November 19: Gino Gavioli, Italian comics artist and animator (Gamma Film, Ulisse e l'Ombra, Caio Gregorio er guardiano der pretorio, Il vigile, Babbut, Mammut e Figliut, Derby, Capitan Trinchetto, Joe Galassia, Serafino spazza antennino, Tacabanda, Cimabue), dies at age 93.
 November 24: 
 Al Brodax, American film and television producer (Paramount, King Features, The Beatles, Yellow Submarine), dies at age 90.
 Florence Henderson, American actress (voice of Grand Mum in Sofia the First, Mallory "Mastermind" Casey in Loonatics Unleashed, Nanny Barbara in The Cleveland Show episode "The Men in Me", Ruby Stone in the Scooby-Doo: Mystery Incorporated episode "Dead Justice", herself in the Nightmare Ned episode "Monster Ned"), dies at age 82.
 November 25: Ron Glass, American actor (voice of Randy Carmichael in Rugrats and All Grown Up!, Dr. Lazenby in Recess: School's Out, Talking Baby in The Proud Family, Kwanseer in the Aladdin episode "Bad Mood Rising", News Anchorman in the Superman: The Animated Series episode "Blasts From The Past"), dies from respiratory failure at age 71.
 November 27: Eric Fredrickson, Canadian animator (Atkinson Film-Arts, The Raccoons, Rupert) and storyboard artist (Atkinson Film-Arts, Young Robin Hood, James Bond Jr., Stunt Dawgs, The Legend of White Fang, Doug, Adventures in Odyssey, Action Man, Life with Louie, Happily Ever After: Fairy Tales for Every Child, Family Guy, Stuart Little, American Dad!), dies at age 54.

December
 December 14: Bernard Fox, Welsh actor (voice of the Chairmouse in The Rescuers and The Rescuers Down Under), dies at age 89.
 December 17: Gordon Hunt, American writer, director (Hanna-Barbera), and actor (voice of Wally in Dilbert), dies at age 87.
 December 26: George S. Irving, American actor (narrator in Underdog, voice of Heat Miser in The Year Without a Santa Claus, and Captain Contagious in Raggedy Ann and Andy: A Musical Adventure), dies at age 94.
 December 27: Carrie Fisher, American actress (voice of Princess Leia in The Star Wars Holiday Special and Robot Chicken: Star Wars Episode II, Angela in Family Guy, Roz Katz in the Dr. Katz, Professional Therapist episode "Thanksgiving"), dies at age 60.
 December 28: Debbie Reynolds, American actress (voice of Charlotte in Charlotte's Web, Mitzi, Mrs. Claus, and Mrs. Prancer in Rudolph the Red-Nosed Reindeer: The Movie, Lulu Pickles in Rugrats, Nana Possible in Kim Possible), dies at age 84.
 December 30: Tyrus Wong, Chinese-American painter, calligrapher, muralist, ceramicist, lithographer, kite designer, set designer, storyboard artist and animator (Walt Disney Company), dies at age 106.

See also 
2016 in anime
List of animated television series of 2016

References

External links 
Animated works of the year, listed in the IMDb

 
2010s in animation
2016